Yuji Funayama may refer to:

Yuji Funayama (basketball) (born 1992), Japanese basketball player
Yuji Funayama (bobsleigh) (born 1953), Japanese bobsledder
Yuji Funayama (footballer) (born 1985), Japanese footballer